Ernst Heinrich Landrock (4 August 1878 in Reinsdorf, Saxony – 30 April 1966 in Kreuzlingen, Switzerland) was a photographer who was based in Tunis, Leipzig and Cairo. He is known for his works with Rudolf Franz Lehnert, published as "Lehnert & Landrock".

References

External links

 Lehnert & Landrock - Biography
 original visuals used for the Muslimgauze's artworks, examples of photographs
 Nooderlich photo festival 

Photographers from Saxony
1878 births
1966 deaths
People from Zwickau (district)
Photography in Egypt
German expatriates in Egypt
German expatriates in Tunisia